Francis Manapul (born August 26, 1979) is a Filipino Canadian comic book artist and writer.

Career
Manapul is known for his work on Witchblade and The Necromancer for Top Cow, working on the former for three years, off and on, returning for the tenth anniversary issue in 2005.
He has provided covers for various titles, most notably for some G.I. Joe comics from Devil's Due Publishing.

In 2007, he signed an exclusive contract to work with DC Comics.
Manapul served as a guest judge in the fourth week round of the third season of Comic Book Idol, a comic book art competition sponsored by Comic Book Resources.

In 2008 Francis became the artist for DC's Legion of Superheroes with Jim Shooter as the writer.  Francis co-created the character Gazelle with Shooter before leaving the title.
In January 2010, Newsarama named Manapul one of ten creators to watch for the coming year.
In 2009, he was named to be the artist in DC's new Flash series written by Geoff Johns which stars Barry Allen in the lead role.

He was also one of the TV presenters on Beast Legends from Yap films, which currently airs Wednesday nights at 10pm EST on History Television Canada. Its premiere in the US was on September 9, Thursday at 10pm EST on SyFy.

In 2011 Manapul was awarded the Joe Shuster Award for Outstanding Artist and the All-in-One Award (Favorite artist known for almost-exclusively inking his/her own interior comic book pencil work and rarely the work of others in '10) from the Inkwell Awards. That May, DC Comics announced a massive revamp and relaunch of their entire superhero line, as part of this Francis was named writer/artist on the Flash, with his longtime colorist/collaborator, Brian Buccellato co-writing with him.

In April 2014, Manapul and Buccellato moved from The Flash to Detective Comics. 
That August, Manapul created Batman poster for New York Comic Con.
In 2016, Manapul became the writer and artist for the DC Rebirth comic book series Trinity.

Bibliography

Interior work
Love in Tights #1 (with J. Torres, Slave Labor Graphics, 1998)
Monster Fighters, Inc. (with J. Torres, Image):
The Ghosts of Christmas (one-shot, 1999)
The Black Book (one-shot, 2000)
Fear Effect: Retro Helix (with Frank Mastromauro and David Wohl, one-shot, Top Cow, 2001)
Witchblade (Top Cow):
 "XLVIII" (with Paul Jenkins, in #48, 2001)
Witchblade/Lady Death (with David Wohl and Joel Gomez, one-shot, 2001)
 "LIII" (with Paul Jenkins, David Wohl and Brian Ching, in #53, 2002)
 "The Return of Tora No Shi" (with David Wohl and Joel Gomez, in #54-57, 2002)
 "Endgame, Part Two" (with David Wohl, Joel Gomez and Eric Basaldua, in #60, 2002)
 "LXII-LXV" (with David Wohl, Joel Gomez, Mike Choi and Romano Molenaar, in #62-65, 2003)
 "Road Trip" (with David Wohl, Joel Gomez and Mike Choi, in #68-69, 2003)
 "Death Pool" (with David Wohl, Joel Gomez, Mike Choi and David Nakayama, in #70 & 72-75, 2003–2004)
 "10th Anniversary" (with Ron Marz and various artists, in #92, 2005)
Tomb Raider: The Series (Top Cow):
 "Without Limit" (with Dan Jurgens, in #15, 2001)
 "Alpha Omega" (with Dan Slott, in #50, 2005)
Image Comics FCBD '04: "First Strike" (with Robert Place Napton, Image, 2004)
Magdalena/Vampirella (with Robert Kirkman, one-shot, Top Cow, 2004)
The Darkness #21: "The Reckoning" (with Brian Buccelato, Top Cow, 2005)
Necromancer #1-6 (with Joshua Ortega, Top Cow, 2006)
The Iron Saint (with Jason Rubin, Aspen):
Iron and the Maiden  #0-4 (with Joel Gomez, 2007)
Iron and the Maiden: Brutes, Bims and the City (with various artists, one-shot, 2008)
Sept Guerrières (7 Warriors) (with Michaël Le Galli, graphic novel, Delcourt, 2008)
Legion of Superheroes (Vol. 5) #37-46, 48-49 (2008–2009)
Adventure Comics #0-3, 5-6 (with Geoff Johns, DC Comics, 2009–2010)
Superman/Batman  #60-61 (2009), #75 (2010)
The Flash (Vol. 3) #1-6, 9-10, 12 (2010–2011)
The Flash (Vol. 4) #1-25 (writer/artist, with Brian Buccellato, 2011–2013)
Detective Comics (Vol. 2) #30-34, 37-44 (writer/artist, with Brian Buccellato, DC Comics, 2014-2015)
Flash Special Edition #1 (2014)
Batman and Robin Eternal #5 (2015)
Justice League (Vol. 2) #45-46 (2015)
Trinity (Vol. 2) #1-2 (2016), #5-6 (2017), #9-11 (2017)
Batman: The Merciless #1 (2017)
Justice League: No Justice #1-4 (2018)
Justice League (Vol. 4) #10-11 (2018), #22 (2019)
Aquaman/Justice League Drowned Earth #1 (2018)

Cover work

Aspen MLT 
Soulfire: Chaos Reign #2 (Aspen, 2006)
Aspen Showcase: Benoist #1 (Aspen, 2008)
Executive Assistant Iris #2 (Aspen, 2009)
Soulfire #2 (Aspen, 2010)

DC Comics 
Legion of Superheroes #47, 50 (2008–2009)
Wonder Woman #32 (2009)
Red Robin #1-5 (2009)
Green Lantern (Vol. 4) #45 (variant cover) (2009)
Blackest Night: The Flash #1-3 (variant covers) (2009-2010)
The Shield (Vol. 2) #1-3 (2009–2010)
Justice League of America (Vol. 2) #46 (variant cover) (2010), #49 (variant cover) (2010)
Adventure Comics #4 (2010)
Superboy (Vol. 4) #5 (variant cover) (2011)
T.H.U.N.D.E.R. Agents (Vol. 3) #5 (2011)
The Flash (Vol. 3) #7, #11 (2011)
Flashpoint: Grodd of War #1 (2011)
Flashpoint: Kid Flash Lost #1-3 (2011)
Green Lantern Corps (Vol. 2) #62 (variant cover) (2011)
Green Lantern (Vol. 5) #4 (variant cover) (2012)
Sword of Sorcery Featuring Amethyst (Vol. 2) #2 (variant cover) (2012)
Superman Unchained #5 (Superman 75th Anniversary 1930s variant cover) (2013)
Flash Season Zero #1 (variant cover) (2014)
Lobo (Vol. 3) #3 (variant cover) (2014)
Superman (Vol. 4) #36 (variant cover) (2014)
Superman/Wonder Woman #16 (variant cover) (2015)
Justice League of America (Vol. 4) #2 (variant cover) (2015)
Aquaman (Vol. 5) #44 (variant cover) (2015)
Convergence #4 (variant cover) (2015)
Multiversity #2 (variant cover) (2015)
Batman/Superman #25 (2015)
Justice League: The Darkseid War Superman #1 (2015)
Justice League: The Darkseid War Lex Luthor #1 (2015)
Justice League: The Darkseid War Flash #1 (2015)
Justice League: The Darkseid War SHAZAM #1 (2015)
Justice League: The Darkseid War Batman #1 (2015)
Justice League: The Darkseid War Green Lantern #1 (2015)
Batgirl (Vol. 5) #1-12 (variant covers) (2016-2017), #34-36 (2019)
Superman: American Alien #5 (variant cover) (2016)
Scooby Apocalypse #5 (variant cover) (2016)
Flash Omnibus By Francis Manapul & Brian Buccellato (new cover) (2016)
Kamandi Challenge #10 (2017)
Hal Jordan And The Green Lantern Corps #33-36 (2017-2018)
Action Comics (Vol. 3) #992 (2017), #993-994 (variant covers) (2017), #1001-1006 (variant covers) (2018-2019), #1009-1011 (2019)
Teen Titans (Vol. 6) #15 (2017)
Super Sons #11 (2017)
Justice League/Aquaman: Drowned Earth #1 (variant cover) (2018)
Flash Starting Line DC Essential Edition (new cover) (2018)
Titans (Vol. 3) #36 (variant cover) (2019)
Green Arrow (Vol. 7) #49 (variant cover) (2019)
Justice League (Vol. 4) #18 (2019), #26 (2019)
Flash (Vol. 5) #75 (Year of the Villain variant cover) (2019)

Devil's Due Publishing 
G.I. Joe #16 (Devil's Due, 2003)
G.I. Joe: Reborn #1 (Devil's Due, 2004)
G.I. Joe Declassified #1-3 (Devil's Due, 2006)
G.I. Joe Dreadnoks: Declassified #1-3 (Devil's Due, 2006–2007)
G.I. Joe Special Missions: Antarctica #1 (Devil's Due, 2006)

Image Comics 
Witchblade #43, 55-56, 61, 62-65, 68-70, 73, 84 (Top Cow, 2000–2005)
The Darkness #2 (Top Cow, 2003)
 Masters of the Universe (Vol. 3) #2 (variant cover) (2002)
 G.I. Joe: Frontline #9-14 (2003)
Pilot Season: The Necromancer #1 (Top Cow, 2007)
 Sons Of The Devil #5 (variant cover) (2015)

Writer

DC Comics 
 Detective Comics: Futures End #1 (2014)
 Justice League: The Darkseid War Superman #1 (2015)
 Justice League: The Darkseid War Lex Luthor #1 (2015)
 Trinity (Vol. 2) #1-6 (2016-2017), #9-11 (2017)

Notes

References

Kousemaker, Kees. Francis Manapul. Kees Kousemaker's Lambiek Comiclopedia. Retrieved November 15, 2011.

External links

Current blog and old one
Francis Manapul at DeviantArt

Reviews
 Review of Witchblade #54, #56, #57, #68 and #69 at Comics Bulletin
 Review of Lara Croft: Tomb Raider #50 at Comics Bulletin
 Review of Necromancer #1 and #2 at Comics Bulletin

Canadian comics artists
Canadian people of Filipino descent
Living people
Place of birth missing (living people)
1979 births
Joe Shuster Award winners for Outstanding Artist
Filipino comics artists